The 2022 WTA Slovenia Open (also known as the Zavarovalnica Sava Portorož for sponsorship purposes) is a WTA 250 tournament play on outdoor hard courts. It is the 8th edition of the Slovenia Open. The 2022 event took place at the Tennis Club Portorož in Portorož, Slovenia from 12 to 18 September 2022.

The event was held on the second consecutive year in the alternative sporting calendar, however, it was one of the six tournaments that were given single-year WTA 250 licenses in September and October 2022 due to the cancellation of tournaments in China during the 2022 season because of the ongoing COVID-19 pandemic, as well as the suspension of tournaments in China following former WTA player Peng Shuai's allegation of sexual assault against a Chinese government official.

Champions

Singles 

  Kateřina Siniaková def.  Elena Rybakina, 6–7(4–7), 7–6(7–5), 6–4

This was Siniaková's third WTA Tour singles title, and her first since 2017.

Doubles 

  Marta Kostyuk /  Tereza Martincová def.  Cristina Bucșa /  Tereza Mihalíková 6–4, 6–0

Singles main draw entrants

Seeds 

† Rankings are as of 29 August 2022.

Other entrants 
The following players received wildcard entry into the singles main draw:
  Elizabeth Mandlik
  Petra Marčinko
  Emma Raducanu

The following player received entry into the singles main draw with a special ranking:
  Laura Siegemund

The following players received entry from the qualifying draw:
  Cristina Bucșa
  Jodie Burrage
  Anna-Lena Friedsam
  Elena-Gabriela Ruse
  Tara Würth
  Anastasia Zakharova

The following player received entry as a lucky loser:
  Harriet Dart

Withdrawals 
Before the tournament
  Marie Bouzková → replaced by  Diane Parry
  Anhelina Kalinina → replaced by  Donna Vekić
  Anna Kalinskaya → replaced by  Tamara Zidanšek
  Barbora Krejčíková → replaced by  Lesia Tsurenko
  Bernarda Pera → replaced by  Harriet Dart
  Liudmila Samsonova → replaced by  Dayana Yastremska
  Alison Van Uytvanck → replaced by  Claire Liu

Doubles main draw entrants

Seeds

Rankings are as of August 29, 2022.

Other entrants
The following pairs received wildcards into the doubles main draw:
  Tímea Babos /  Tamara Zidanšek 
  Pia Lovrič /  Lara Smejkal

The following pair received entry as alternates:
  Nigina Abduraimova /  Jodie Burrage

Withdrawals
Before the tournament
  Alena Fomina-Klotz /  Dalila Jakupović → replaced by  Alena Fomina-Klotz /  Ingrid Gamarra Martins
  Anna Kalinskaya /  Tereza Mihalíková → replaced by  Cristina Bucșa /  Tereza Mihalíková
  Andreja Klepač /  Elena Rybakina → replaced by  Andreja Klepač /  Laura Siegemund
  Nicole Melichar-Martinez /  Laura Siegemund → replaced by  Adrienn Nagy /  Nika Radišić
  Diane Parry /  Clara Tauson → replaced by  Nigina Abduraimova /  Jodie Burrage

References

External links 

2022 WTA Tour
Banka Koper Slovenia Open
Zavarovalnica Sava Portorož
Zavarovalnica Sava Portorož